(known in North America as Heavyweight Championship Boxing) is a boxing video game, developed by Tose and published by Tonkin House which was released in 1990.

Once the player chooses a boxer, the other challengers must be defeated in order to gain the title. Points can be distributed and re-distributed on the fighter's health meter, stamina, and how fast he moves around in the ring. Either uppercuts or normal punches can be used to wear down the opponent in the game.

See also
Sports Collection

External links
 GameFAQs Data: http://www.gamefaqs.com/gameboy/585741-heavyweight-championship-boxing
 MobyGames Data: http://www.mobygames.com/game/gameboy/heavyweight-championship-boxing
 GameFAQs Japanese Box Art: http://www.gamefaqs.com/gameboy/585741-heavyweight-championship-boxing/images/box-81947
 GameFAQs Images: http://www.gamefaqs.com/gameboy/585741-heavyweight-championship-boxing/images

1990 video games
Game Boy-only games
Tonkin House games
Tose (company) games
Activision games
Boxing video games
Fighting games
Video games developed in Japan
Multiplayer and single-player video games
Game Boy games